Microclytus is a genus of beetles in the family Cerambycidae, containing the following species:

 Microclytus compressicollis (Laporte & Gory, 1835)
 Microclytus gazellula (Haldeman, 1847)

References

Anaglyptini